Mătişeşti may refer to several places in Romania:

 Mătişeşti, a village in Ciuruleasa Commune, Alba County
 Mătişeşti, a village in Horea Commune, Alba County
 Mătișești River, a tributary of the Ploștini River in Romania